The Haunted Bedroom is a lost 1919 American silent drama film directed by Fred Niblo and starring Enid Bennett and Dorcas Matthews. The film was also distributed under the title The Ghost of Whispering Oaks.

Plot
As described in a film magazine, New York reporter Betsy Thorne (Bennett) travels to the railroad station in a Southern state to investigate a missing man where she overhears a conversation between the sheriff and an imported detective that reporters are barred from the house and grounds where the mystery has taken place. By good fortune she comes across a maid sent to the house from Richmond, and so frightens her that she gains a chance to act in her place. She finds an extraordinary set of affairs at the house, and during the first night is nearly terrified out of her senses when, hiding in the chapel, she sees a ghostly figure come from the grand organ. The house is roused by her screams as she flees the room, and she is forbidden from going back there by the sister of the missing man. During the following night she is locked in her room during a thunderstorm, and while escaping through a window sees the ghostly figure again in the family graveyard. She enlists the aid of an old black man and, both badly scared, make an investigation which starts from a particular chord played at the grand organ. They find that certain keys cause a secret door in the organ to open, revealing a secret passage to a family tomb. There she discovers two expert crooks and solves a mystery that has baffled the detectives, laying bare the scheme to extort a young man accused of the crime whom she has become deeply interested.

Cast
 Enid Bennett as Betsy Thorne
 Dorcas Matthews as Dolores Arnold
 Jack Nelson as Daniel Arnold
 Lloyd Hughes as Roland Dunwoody
 William Conklin as Dr. James Dunwoody
 Harry Archer as John Wells
 Otto Hoffman as Managing Editor
 Joe Anthony as Uncle Moseby Adams

References

External links
 
 Film still at silentfilmstillarchive.com

1919 films
1919 drama films
1919 lost films
Silent American drama films
American silent feature films
American black-and-white films
Films directed by Fred Niblo
Lost American films
Lost drama films
1910s American films